Stefan Edouard Mols (born 31 January 1999) is a Spanish professional footballer who plays as a midfielder for Warrington Town.

Club career
In January 2017, the 18 year old signed a professional contract with the first team, penning a deal which would keep him in the club till the summer of 2019.
On 4 October 2017, Mols made his professional debut for Blackburn Rovers in their EFL Trophy tie against Bury, replacing Craig Conway in the 1-0 defeat.

On 6 October Mols joined Intercity on loan until end of the season.  On 22 January Mols returned to Rovers.

Mols was released by Rovers at the end of the 2020–21 season at the expiration of his contract with the club.

On 12 October 2021, Mols joined Warrington Town. Mols signed a new one-year deal in July 2022.

Career statistics

References

External links

Living people
1999 births
Spanish footballers
Footballers from Andalusia
Association football midfielders
Blackburn Rovers F.C. players
Warrington Town F.C. players
Primera Federación players
Northern Premier League players
Spanish expatriate footballers
Expatriate footballers in England
Spanish expatriate sportspeople in England
CF Intercity players